The following restaurants and restaurant chains are located in Houston, in the U.S. state of Texas:

 Agora
 Anderson Fair Retail Restaurant
 Antone's Famous Po' Boys
 Bambolino's
 Brasil
 Chapultepec Lupita
 Downtown Aquarium
 Empire Cafe
 Frenchy's Chicken
 James Coney Island
 Joe's Crab Shack
 Katz's Deli
 Kemah Boardwalk
 Kim Sơn
 Landry's, Inc.
 Luby's
 Maggie Rita's
 Mai's
 Marble Slab Creamery
 Mexican Restaurants, Inc.
 Molina's Cantina
 Niko Niko's
 Ninfa's
 One Fifth
 Pappas Restaurants
 Prince's Hamburgers
 Salata
 Saltgrass Steak House
 Shipley Do-Nuts
 Taste of Texas
 Two Pesos
 Vic & Anthony's Steakhouse

Defunct
 Benjy's
 Dolce Vita
 Yia Yia Mary's

See also
 List of companies in Houston

Restaurants
Houston